William Gregory Magnussen (born April 20, 1985) is an American actor. He has been featured in the films Into the Woods (2014), Birth of the Dragon (2016), Game Night (2018), and Aladdin (2019), and has had supporting television roles in Get Shorty (2017) and Maniac (2018). In 2021, Magnussen starred in the sci-fi  series Made for Love on HBO Max and appeared in the films The Many Saints of Newark and No Time to Die.

He has starred in Broadway and off-Broadway theater productions, including 2013's Vanya and Sonia and Masha and Spike, for which he received a nomination for the Tony Award for Best Featured Actor in a Play.

Early life
Magnussen was born in Woodhaven, Queens, New York City, the son of Daina, an aerobics instructor, and Greg Magnussen, a professional bodybuilder and kickboxer. He has two younger brothers. His maternal grandparents were Lithuanian immigrants. He is of Norwegian and Lithuanian descent. He grew up in Queens around Woodhaven Boulevard until the age of 10, when he moved with his family to Cumming, Georgia. Magnussen graduated from South Forsyth High School in 2003, and later from the University of North Carolina School of the Arts.

Acting career

Stage
Magnussen made his Broadway stage debut in 2007's The Ritz, starring Rosie Perez. In 2012, he was cast alongside David Hyde Pierce and Sigourney Weaver in Christopher Durang's Vanya and Sonia and Masha and Spike, premiering at the McCarter Theatre in Princeton, New Jersey, prior to its move to Lincoln Center in New York City. It then moved to the John Golden Theatre, where it was nominated for six Tony Awards. Magnussen was nominated for a Tony Award for Best Featured Actor in a Play for his role as Spike. In 2014, he starred on Off-Broadway with Anna Gunn in a critically acclaimed production of Sex with Strangers directed by David Schwimmer at the Second Stage Theater.

Film
Magnussen appeared in the films Blood Night: The Legend of Mary Hatchet and Happy Tears, which stars Demi Moore and Parker Posey. He starred as Claude in the film Twelve, which was released July 30, 2010. He played Neil Thomas, a World War II hero, in the 2011 film The Lost Valentine, based on the book of the same name by James Michael Pratt, which aired on CBS on January 30, 2011. That same year, he also played Thor in Whit Stillman's Damsels in Distress. In 2012, he starred in the independent feature Surviving Family.

Magnussen starred in his breakout role as Rapunzel's Prince in Rob Marshall's 2014 film Into the Woods. In 2016, Magnussen appeared in The Great Gilly Hopkins, opposite Kathy Bates, as Ellis, the social worker in charge of Gilly Hopkins, played by Canadian actress Sophie Nélisse. The role was originally written for a female in the novel and stage play. In 2019, Magnussen played the newly created role of Prince Anders in Disney's live action adaptation of Aladdin, directed by Guy Ritchie.

In the 25th James Bond film No Time to Die (from Eon Productions), Magnussen plays CIA officer Logan Ash, who tries to convince a retired Bond to assist with a mission.

Television
Magnussen played Kato Kaelin on the first season of American Crime Story, about the O. J. Simpson murder case. He is known for his role on the CBS soap opera As the World Turns, where he took over the role of Casey Hughes on January 29, 2008. He guest-starred on The CW's series The Beautiful Life: TBL in 2009. He guest-starred on Boardwalk Empire as Roger McAlister, Gillian Darmody's (Gretchen Mol) ill-fated lover, and was the stand-in for Jimmy Darmody's (Michael Pitt) corpse.

He also guest-starred on Law & Order: Criminal Intent, in the 10th-season episode "Icarus", and on Law & Order, in the 19th-season episode, "Sweetie". Magnussen appeared in four episodes of The Divide, guest-starred on NCIS: Los Angeles in episode 3 of season 2, titled "Borderline", and in episode 6 of the first season of The Leftovers. In 2017, Magnussen guest-starred as Russ Snyder on Unbreakable Kimmy Schmidt.

Magnussen also played a high school teacher Joshua "Nick" Sullivan who engages in a relationship with one of his students in Tell Me a Story during the first season, which came out in 2018.

Music career
Magnussen once was the bass player and a contributing songwriter for the New York City-based rock band The Dash. He plays guitar in the New York City-based band Reserved for Rondee.

Filmography

Film

Television

Stage

Accolades

References

External links
 

1985 births
21st-century American male actors
American male film actors
American male bass guitarists
American male soap opera actors
American male stage actors
American male television actors
American people of Lithuanian descent
American people of Norwegian descent
Guitarists from Georgia (U.S. state)
Guitarists from New York City
Living people
Male actors from Georgia (U.S. state)
Male actors from New York City
People from Cumming, Georgia
People from Woodhaven, Queens
Songwriters from Georgia (U.S. state)
Songwriters from New York (state)
University of North Carolina School of the Arts alumni
21st-century American bass guitarists
21st-century American male musicians
American male songwriters